Linda Douma (born 1944) is a former Miss Canada.

Douma was born in Tofino and raised in Sidney, British Columbia, where her family moved when she was two years old. She studied Spanish and French at the University of Victoria. She won the Miss Sidney and Miss PNE (Pacific National Exhibition) Pageants in 1963 as well. 

Her selection in 1964 as Miss Canada was based on a talent competition, where she sang a folk song, and on her appearance in a bathing suit and in an evening dress. Her prizes were a $1000 scholarship and $5000 in various tokens, which included a watch, a necklace, a console radio-phonograph, a wardrobe, and a three-week trip to Hawaii. She was also secured a job with an annual salary exceeding $5000, and was selected to represent Canada at various public events around the world.

Douma was the first Miss Canada winner to travel abroad, which included trips to Hong Kong and Japan, and Cyprus.

References

Living people
Miss Canada winners
1944 births
University of Victoria alumni